Chanasma is one of the 182 Legislative Assembly constituencies of Gujarat state in India. It is part of Patan district. It is numbered as 17-Chanasama.

List of segments
This assembly seat represents the following segments:

 Harij Taluka
 Chanasma Taluka
 Sami Taluka (part) villages – Tarora, Sami, Nayka, Kokta, Upaliyasara, Dudkha, Memna, Moti Chandur, Kathi, Ravad, Palipur, Kukrana, Vaghel, Aritha, Buda, Rasulpura, Vagosan, Orumana, Mujpur, Loteshvar, Islampura, Jesda, Khijadiyari, Lolada, Sipur, Kunvar, Subapura, Taranagar, Rajpura, Pirojpura, Fattehganj, Mardanganj, Kanchanpura, Khandiya, Shankheshvar, Runi, Ranod, Kuvarad, Manvarpura, Biliya, Tuvad, Fatehpura, Dhanora, Dantisana, Mankodiya, Padla, Ratanpura, Bolera, Jahurpura, Murtujanagar, Panchasar.

Members of Legislative Assembly

Election results

2022

2017

2012

See also
 List of constituencies of the Gujarat Legislative Assembly
 Patan district

References

External links
 

Assembly constituencies of Gujarat
Patan district